Mian Khan is a village in District Mardan of Khyber Pakhtunkhwa Pakistan.
It is part of Kohi barmol union council of Katlang tehsil along with Sangao village. The Village lies 19 miles northeast of Mardan city at the foot of the Mountain Range. This mountain range contains the highest peak of Mardan district locally known as Pajja or Sakra.Another small mountain named sheikh kara baba is also well known place there,local people and guests visit there to enjoy the beauty of Mian khan. In the recent years access to Peer Baba and Kingergallay was completed through these mountains called TANGA .. Large number of visitors from local area visits Tanga mostly on Friday and on Eid days to enjoy the beauty of this place. A grave has been placed called " Shaheeda abay" whose body was found during the construction of the road and people of the area decided place the grave on the same road side.And now they constructed a Masjid and named as Shaheeda Jumaat.. This longest mountain area is very famous for wild goat hunting.
The historical kashmir smast can also be accessed easily..

People

The inhabitants of the village belong to Utmankhel tribe of pakhtun the descendants of Utman bin Karlanr (the famous karlanri qabayal). There are three main clans of utman Khel tribe i.e. Miskeen khel, Mirhawas khel and Achoo khel living in the village which are subdivided further into smaller groups or khels. The traditional hujra system of Pashtun culture is still alive here.we can divide the inhabitants of mian khan in four cast mirwaskhail, Aloo Khail, Moosa khail Zain khan khel and maskeen khal & Darab khel ...

In Mian Khan there are three primary school's and two high school. Four private school Islamia public, Muhammad bin Qasim, Utmankhel Public School and East Hills Public School. One is the largest mosque of MARDAN mosque name MASSJED E QUBAA

The village had produced prominent figures in local and provincial politics.

Mr. Tajbar Khan ”Deceased’  MPA from PK 21 during 1985-1988.
Mr. Hafiz Akhtar Ali is MPA from PK 28 since 2002 and was irrigation minister of Khyber Pakhtunkhwa during the period of MMA government from 2002 till 2008.
Mr. Dr. Rahim khan was  Nazim from UC kohi Barmol during 2005-2010
Mr. Hafiz saleem is now the member of tehsil council.

Pushto culture in the village there are many poets . which is improving Pashto Adab. These are Razi kaka, Sher Nawab,  /Shahid Gul ”Deceased’  and Muhammed Younas khan. These are the poet which's are working for Pashto Adab.

Education

There are two primary and one High school for boys, one primary and One High school for girls, four private schools (Muhammad bin Qasim Academy, Islamia public school,Utmankhail public school and East Hills Public School) are also participating in growth of kids and education.

Level of education in past few years increased considerably but due to lake of resources and unavailability of Colleges, 85% of the students are forced to join Govt jobs or start earning to support their families after Secondary school education. 
An organization of young , educated and sincere team, EHSAS is working to striving their best to help the needy students. EHSAS conducted Free tuition program for 9th and 10th standard in order to help the student in securing good position and so far they are achieving their goal. From 2001 onward the education rate has increased considerably, this small village produced some good talent who secure good positions at college and university level.

Climate

There are four seasons "Spring, Summer, Winter and Autumn" In the winter season sometime snow falls on the Mountains creates a very cold weather and temperature comes down to 0-5 C°. Summer season becomes very hot in the month of July and Aug and temperature goes to 40-45 C°. Spring season is very beautiful, the season makes Miankhan as a part of heaven. Most of the abroad inhabitants tries to come for vacation and enjoy the season in the month of Feb and March. There are a number of wells which serves drinking water to the inhabitants of the village. Most of the people comes out for walk after Asar Prayer and enjoying the seasons.

History
A team of archaeologists from Abdul Wali Khan University Mardan (AWKUM) has identified an excavation site in Mian Khan village, Katlang with the aim to put the area on the world’s archaeological map. During the month-long excavation which began on May 2, a number of relics dating back to 190 BC have been discovered, contributing significantly to the archaeological profile of the district.”

The Vice Chancellor Abdul Wali Khan University, Prof. Dr. Ihsan Ali reiterated that Mardan has been the centre of Gandhara Civilization and traces of 40,000 years old ancient human civilization have been found in Sangahu (Katlang) that marks the significance of this region. This, he said on the occasion of interacting with the students and locals of the area, during the excavation led by Abdul Wali Khan University at Mian Khan Kohi Tangi.

See also
 Katlang
 Sangao (Mardan District)
 Babozai
 Mardan
 Mardan District

References

Populated places in Mardan District